Abdallah al-Khazin was a military commander who served the Ikhshidids of Egypt.

In 956/7, he conquered the town of Ibrim in Nubia, while in 956/7, 960/1, and 964/5 he led unsuccessful naval raids against the Byzantine Empire, the last one along with a fleet from Syria. Sometime between the last two raids he also participated, as second-in-command, in another raid led by Abu'l-Faraj al-Tarsusi.

References

Sources
 

10th-century Arabs
Arab people of the Arab–Byzantine wars
Ikhshidid military leaders
Admirals of the medieval Islamic world